The Men's road race of the 2015 UCI Road World Championships was a cycling event that took place on September 27, 2015, in Richmond, Virginia, United States. It was the 82nd edition of the championship, and Poland's Michał Kwiatkowski was the defending champion.

Peter Sagan of Slovakia attacked on the final climb up 23rd Street and managed to stay clear of the field to take his first world title. Three seconds behind, Australian rider Michael Matthews and Lithuania's Ramūnas Navardauskas led home a 24-rider group to take the silver and bronze medals respectively.

Course

All road races took place on a challenging, technical and inner-city road circuit,  in length.

The circuit headed west from Downtown Richmond, working its way onto Monument Avenue, a paver-lined, historic boulevard that's been named one of the "10 Great Streets in America". Cyclists took a 180-degree turn at the Jefferson Davis monument and then maneuvered through the Uptown district and Virginia Commonwealth University. Halfway through the circuit, the race headed down into Shockoe Bottom before following the canal and passing Great Shiplock Park, the start of the Virginia Capital Trail. A sharp, off-camber turn at Rocketts Landing brought the riders to the narrow, twisty, cobbled  climb up to Libby Hill Park in the historic Church Hill neighborhood. A quick descent, followed by three hard turns led to a  climb up 23rd Street. Once atop this steep cobbled hill, riders descended into Shockoe Bottom. This led them to the final  climb on Governor Street. At the top, the riders had to take a sharp left turn onto the false-flat finishing straight,  to the finish.

Qualification

Qualification was based on performances on the UCI run tours during 2015. Results from January to the middle of August counted towards the qualification criteria on both the 2015 UCI World Tour and the UCI Continental Circuits across the world, with the rankings being determined upon the release of the numerous tour rankings on August 15, 2015.

The following 51 nations qualified.

The qualification process became subject to criticism after several nations, including Iran, Turkey and Morocco did not take up their allocation.

Schedule
All times are in Eastern Daylight Time (UTC−4).

Final classification

References

External links

Men's road race
UCI Road World Championships – Men's road race
2015 in men's road cycling